Stanley Walter Miles, Stan Miles, (3 September 1913 – August 2004)  was an English amateur cyclist who won the British Best All-Rounder competition in 1935 whilst also leading his club, 'Century Road' C.C., to the title of 'Best All-rounder' team in Great Britain.

His victory tally in 1935 included winning the Anerley '12' hour; the Brighton Mitre '50' mile; the Highgate '100' mile; and the Ealing '50' miles. 

His achievements were further celebrated in 1936 when Cycling Weekly awarded him his own page in the Golden Book of Cycling.

Personal life
Miles lived in St Albans, Hertfordshire, where he ran a cycle shop in Victoria Street and customised both road and track frames.

Career
Throughout 1935 Miles competed in 15 events, winning four and finishing third seven times.  His victory tally included: the Anerley '12' hour with a record distance of 239¼ miles; the Brighton Mitre '50' mile in 2 hours, 7 minutes 3 seconds; the Highgate '100' mile in 4 hours 34 minutes 25 seconds; and the Ealing '50' miles in 2 hours 7 minutes 3 seconds. 

These achievements meant that he won the title of Best All-rounder with an average speed of 21.809 mph, the second fastest ever achieved at that time.

The Golden Book
Stan Miles's achievements were celebrated in 1936 when Cycling Weekly awarded him his own page in the Golden Book of Cycling.

References

English male cyclists
1913 births
Sportspeople from St Albans
2004 deaths